Battsetseg Batmunkh (born 9 December 1973, Bayankhongor) is the Minister of Foreign Affairs of Mongolia since 2021. She holds a Bachelor of Arts in International Relations from the National University of Mongolia in 1996, a Bachelor of Business Administration from the University of Finance and Economics of Mongolia in 2000 and a Master of Business Administration from Maastricht School of Management in 2005. Previously she has served in various executive positions at Munkhiin Useg Group, as Deputy Minister for Foreign Affairs and as ambassador for Mongolia to Italy. She speaks English and Russian.

She is married and has three children.

References 

1973 births
Living people
Ambassadors of Mongolia to Italy
Female foreign ministers
Foreign ministers of Mongolia
Mongolian People's Party politicians
Women government ministers of Mongolia